The seventh season of Family Guy first aired on the Fox network from September 28, 2008 to May 17, 2009 before being released as two DVD box sets and syndicated. The animated television series follows the dysfunctional Griffin family (father Peter, mother Lois, daughter Meg, son Chris, baby Stewie and their anthropomorphic dog Brian), who reside in the town of Quahog. The show features the voices of series creator Seth MacFarlane, Alex Borstein, Seth Green, and Mila Kunis in the roles of the Griffin family. 

The season included hold-over episodes from the sixth season, which was cut short due to the 2007–2008 Writers Guild of America strike. It received a mixed reception from critics, the more-mixed reviews criticizing the overuse of cutaways and the more positive praising its story-based episodes. The seventh season contains some of the series' most acclaimed episodes (including "Road to Germany" and "Family Gay") and controversial episodes like "420", which caused the Venezuelan government to ban the show from its networks. The seventh season was nominated for a Primetime Emmy Award for Outstanding Comedy Series, making Family Guy the first animated series to be nominated in this category since The Flintstones in 1961.

The Volume Seven DVD box set was released in Region 1 on June 16, 2009, Region 2 on November 2, 2009 and Region 4 on September 29, 2009. Nine of the sixteen episodes are included in this volume. The remaining seven episodes of the season were released on the Volume Eight DVD box set in Region 1 on June 15, 2010, Region 2 on November 1, 2010 and Region 4 on June 15, 2011.

Production

The season premiered September 28, 2008 with the episode "Love, Blactually" airing on Fox Broadcasting Company in the United States. During the sixth season of the show, episodes of Family Guy and American Dad! were delayed from regular broadcast due to the 2007–2008 Writers Guild of America strike. Series creator and executive producer Seth MacFarlane sided with the Writers Guild and participated in the strike until its conclusion. Official production of Family Guy was halted for most of December 2007 and intermittent periods afterwards. Fox continued producing episodes without MacFarlane's final approval; although he refused to work on the show during the strike, his contract with Fox required him to contribute to any episodes it subsequently produced. Due to this, most sixth-season episodes had to be pushed back to this one; this left the sixth season with only twelve episodes, and the seventh season began with hold-overs from the previous one.

Crew

MacFarlane, Danny Smith, David Goodman and Chris Sheridan were the executive producers for the season. Richard Appel, Steve Callaghan, Mark Hentemann and Brian Scully were co-executive producers. Other producers included Mike Henry, Patrick Meighan, Tom Devanney, Alec Sulkin, Wellesley Wild, John L. Jacobs, Kara Vallow, Kirker Butler, Shannon Smith, Cherry Chevapravatdumrong, Kim Fertman and Brandi Young.

The writing staff included John Viener, Andrew Goldberg, Matt Fleckenstein, Andrew Gormley, Alex Carter, executive producers Chris Sheridan, Danny Smith, co-executive producers Richard Appel, Mark Hentemann, Brian Scully, supervising producers Mike Henry, Alec Sulkin, Wellesley Wild and co-producers Cherry Chevapravatdumrong and Patrick Meighan. Each wrote one episode, except for Meighan, Sulkin and Chevapravatdumrong (who wrote two each). There were nine directors for the sixteen episodes of the season, with Cyndi Tang, Greg Colton, Julius Wu, Brian Iles, Jerry Langford and Dominic Bianchi directing two episodes each. Peter Shin and James Purdum were supervising directors for the entire season. Walter Murphey composed the season's music tracks, while Stan Jones edited them.

Cast

Season seven had a cast of five main actors. MacFarlane voiced Peter Griffin, a blue-collar worker and the patriarch of the Griffin family. The family's evil-genius baby Stewie, their anthropromorphic pet dog Brian, their sexually-active neighbor Glenn Quagmire, Peter's father-in-law Carter Pewterschmidt, local doctor Elmer Hartman and local news anchor Tom Tucker were also voiced by MacFarlane. Other members of the family include Peter's responsible-but-rebellious wife, Lois (voiced by Alex Borstein); their self-loathing teenage daughter, Meg (voiced by Mila Kunis) and their goofball teenage son, Chris (voiced by Seth Green). Mike Henry voiced the Griffins' neighbor (and Peter's friend) Cleveland Brown.

The season had a number of secondary characters, including Lori Alan as Diane Simmons (a local news anchor); Mike Henry as Cleveland Brown (a neighbor and friend of the Griffins); Patrick Warburton as Joe Swanson (a disabled neighbor) and Jennifer Tilly as Bonnie Swanson (Joe's pregnant wife). Adam West voices an alternative version of himself, Mayor Adam West. Other recurring characters include Phil LaMarr as Ollie Williams, Johnny Brennan as Mort Goldman, Carrie Fisher as Angela, Mark Hentemann as Opie, Borstein as Trisha Takanawa and Henry as Bruce. Staff members Danny Smith, Jon Viener and Alec Sulkin voiced several minor characters. The season introduced New Brian (voiced by Viener), a replacement for the older Brian and Susie, the Swansons' newborn daughter.

The season also included guest actors voicing themselves, including Frank Sinatra Jr., Seth Rogen, Lauren Conrad, Johnny Knoxville, Jay Leno, Craig Ferguson, Audrina Patridge, Sinbad, Patrick Stewart, LeVar Burton, Gates McFadden, Brent Spiner, Michael Dorn, Jonathan Frakes, Wil Wheaton, Denise Crosby and Rob Lowe.

Episodes

Reception
The seventh-season premiere was viewed by 9.2 million viewers, a significantly-higher number than those watching the sixth-season finale. In the weeks following "Love Blactually", viewership hovered around 8 million. "Baby Not On Board" was the most-viewed episode of the season, with 9.97 million views and a 5.0 Nielsen rating. 

Ahsan Haque of IGN graded the seventh season of Family Guy 8.2 out of a possible 10, saying that it was a "very competent season" for the show. He praised the use of the show's hallmark pop-culture references and the writers' more story-driven episodes. Haque considered "Road to Germany" as the highlight of the season and regarded "The Juice is Loose" and "Baby Not On Board" as the poorest, citing them as examples of what the show could be when the writers "choose not to put in any effort". In 2009, IGN included the Star Trek: The Next Generation cast reunion in "Not All Dogs Go to Heaven" in its countdown of "Family Guy's Top 10 Star Trek Moments". Later that year, it included the "Raining Bitches" and the "Boom Goes The Dynamite" moments (both from "Love Blactually") in its "Family Guy's Top 10 Cleveland Moments". In 2010, IGN put "Road to Germany" on its list of "Stewie and Brian's Greatest Adventures". 

Casey Burchby from DVD Talk gave a mixed review to Volume Seven of Family Guy; he noted that while a lot of the jokes are obvious and not funny in the show's context, there are standout episodes such as "I Dream of Jesus" and "Baby Not On Board". He also praised "Road to Germany", which "combines solid writing with some noteworthy design work". Another writer from DVD Talk, Francis Rizzo III, reviewed Volume Eight and praised "Three Kings" for blending humor with the original films and its story-based narrative. He also pointed out that episodes like "420", "Not All Dogs Go to Heaven" and "FOX-y Lady" contained scenes which were like nothing seen on television before.

The Parents Television Council (a frequent critic of Family Guy) branded "Family Gay", "Three Kings" "420", and "Stew-roids" as the "worst show of the week," a title frequently given the series by the group. In response to its group's criticism, executive producer David Goodman claimed that Family Guy is "absolutely for adults" and he does not allow his own children to watch the show. MacFarlane also responded to the PTC's decrees against the show in an interview with The Advocate: "For an organization that prides itself on Christian values — I mean, I’m an atheist, so what do I know? — they spend their entire day hating people."

Mixed assessments came from Robin Pierson of The TV Critic, giving the season an overall score of 49 out of 100. Pierson said that the show had become "predictable, stale and irritating to watch" and that it had become "just like the TV shows it mocked". He criticized some episodes for "insulting their viewers' intelligence" and for being "badly written", although he praised some of the stories for following a logical progression. Pierson considered "We Love You Conrad" as the best episode of the season (rating it 67 out of 100), and "Baby Not On Board" as the poorest (rating it 12).

The Venezuelan government reacted negatively to "420", and banned Family Guy from their local networks (which generally air syndicated American programming). Local station Televen was threatened with fines for broadcasting the show (which were avoided by airing an episode of Baywatch instead), and it aired public-service films as an apology. Venezuelan Justice Minister Tareck El Aissami stated that any cable stations which refuse to stop airing the series would be fined, and he claimed that the program promoted the use of cannabis.

Awards and nominations
The season was nominated for a Primetime Emmy Award for Outstanding Comedy Series. The last animated program to be nominated was The Flintstones in 1961. Seth MacFarlane was nominated for a Primetime Emmy Award for Outstanding Voice-Over Performance for his role as Peter Griffin in "I Dream of Jesus". MacFarlane was also nominated for an Annie Award for the same episode, but lost to Ahmed Best from Robot Chicken. "Road to Germany" was nominated for a Golden Reel Award for Best Sound Editing, but lost to the Star Wars: The Clone Wars episode "Lair of Grievous".

Home media
The first nine episodes of the seventh season were released on DVD by 20th Century Fox in the United States and Canada on June 16, 2009, one month after the last episode was broadcast. The "Volume 7" DVD release features bonus material, including deleted scenes, animatics and commentary for each episode. The remaining seven episodes were released on "Volume 8" in the United States.

References

External links

 
Family Guy seasons
2008 American television seasons
2009 American television seasons